Mia Kåberg (born 9 June 1958) is a former Swedish footballer. Kåberg was a member of the Swedish national team that won the 1984 European Competition for Women's Football.

References

1958 births
Living people
Damallsvenskan players
Women's association football defenders
Swedish women's footballers
Sweden women's international footballers
UEFA Women's Championship-winning players